Mi'kmaq History Month is promoted annually in Nova Scotia as a way to build public awareness of Mi'kmaw culture and heritage. It begins on Treaty Day, October 1. It was proclaimed in 1993 by then Premier John Savage and Mi'kmaq Grand Chief Ben Sylliboy.

Activities and events that share and showcase Mi’kmaw history take place across Nova Scotia. Events in schools include in-class studies, assemblies, special events and visits from special guests. Other events include the annual  Wagmatcook Aboriginal Arts and Culture Festival, lectures and basket-making workshops.

References

External links
Wi'kipatmu'k Mi'kmawey – Honoring of the Mi'kmaw way

First Nations in Nova Scotia
Mi'kmaq in Canada